The globalization of the National Hockey League has been occurring since its inception.  The early years saw a largely Canadian league, with some Americans playing. As the league progressed it experienced an influx of European players, at first from Western European countries such as Sweden. After the fall of Communism, players from Eastern European countries, such as the former Czechoslovakia and Soviet Union, joined the league.  The NHL eventually saw fewer European players, but more players from Canada and the United States.  Today the NHL has players from five continents.  The following is a list of countries and the first person born there that played in the National Hockey League.  These players are not necessarily the first citizen of each respective country to play in the NHL, as nationality is determined under a nation's nationality law and may differ. Additionally, some countries have had citizens play in the NHL, but have never had a native-born player reach the league.

Most statistical sources in the sport follow the convention of the Hockey Hall of Fame in classifying players by the currently existing countries in which their birthplaces are located.

Current countries

Former countries

Notes

References

See also
List of NHL statistical leaders by country

Countries, first
National Hockey League player, first